The Center for the Jewish Future is a non-profit center at Yeshiva University.

Overview
Their mission is to shape, enrich, and inspire the contemporary Jewish community by convening the resources of Yeshiva University and:
Infuse the student body with a spirit of leadership and sense of responsibility to the Jewish People and society in general
Build, cultivate, and support communities and their lay and rabbinic leaders
Create a global movement that promotes the values of Yeshiva University

It consists of six divisions:

 The Max Stern Division of Communal Services (at the Rabbi Isaac Elchanan Theological Seminary) offers continuing education for rabbis, rebbetzins, and educators under the age of 40, as well as lay leaders.
 The Gertrude and Morris Bienenfeld Department of Rabbinic Services (Max Stern Division of Communal Services/Rabbi Isaac Elchanan Theological Seminary) provides training and placement services for rabbis and educators.
 The Community Initiative Division promotes education programming, outreach, dialogue, and tikkun olam.
 The Association of Modern Orthodox Day Schools provides educational services, advocates for member schools, and interfaces on their behalf with Yeshiva University faculty and students.
 The Leadership Training Division runs a number of programs including Quest (Quality Education Skills Training) that helps undergraduate students become more effective participants and leaders in Jewish Communal organizations. The Eimatai Leadership Development Project coordinates leadership training seminars for high school students across North America to focus on Social Action and Social Justice through a Jewish lens. 
 The Research Division focuses on practical solutions to challenges such as infertility and organ donation. The division also includes the Torah U-Madda Project (including the Orthodox Forum, the Torah U-Madda Journal, and Ten Da’at: A Journal of Jewish Education) and hosts several independent organizations, including the Organization for the Resolution of Agunot (helping to prevent agunot or abandoned wives) and the Orthodox Caucus.

Rabbi Yaakov Glasser is dean of the Center for the Jewish Future. He succeeds Rabbi Kenneth Brander who was the inaugural dean of the CJF for nine years.

References

External links 
 Yeshiva University
 Yeshiva University Center for the Jewish Future
 Rabbi Isaac Elchanan Theological Seminary
 The Organization for the Resolution of Agunot

Yeshiva University
Jewish organizations
Articles containing video clips